Dott is an unincorporated community and coal town in Mercer County, West Virginia, United States. Dott was commonly known by "Turkey Gap Consolidated Coal Company", which was part of Dott.

A variant name was Wenonah.

References

Unincorporated communities in Mercer County, West Virginia
Unincorporated communities in West Virginia
Coal towns in West Virginia